Viișoara is a commune in Bihor County, Crișana, Romania with a population of 1,336 people. It is composed of four villages: Izvoarele (Szolnokháza), Pădureni (Erdőtelep), Reghea (Csekenye), and Viișoara.

References

Communes in Bihor County
Localities in Crișana